The 2020 Emir of Qatar Cup was the 48th edition of the Qatari cup tournament in men's football. It was played by the first and second level divisions of the Qatari football league structure.  Due to the COVID-19 pandemic in Qatar, it was initially postponed. Al Sadd defeated Al Arabi 2–1 in the Final to win the cup, guaranteeing a place in the 2021 AFC Champions League.

Note: all matches in Qatar time (GMT+3).

Round of 16

Quarter-finals

Semi-finals

Final

Top goalscorers

References

External links
Amir Cup, Qatar Football Association
Emir Cup 2020, Soccerway

Football cup competitions in Qatar
Qatar
2019–20 in Qatari football
Emir of Qatar Cup, 2020